Eois perstrigata is a moth in the  family Geometridae. It is found in Peru.

The wingspan is about 26 mm. The forewings are pale lilac-grey along the costa and pale brick-red below, with fine dark speckling. The lines are dark brown and consist of two basal and an antemedian line. The hindwings are brick-red with four lines.

References

Moths described in 1907
Taxa named by William Warren (entomologist)
Eois
Moths of South America